Dewey Jackson Short (April 7, 1898 – November 19, 1979) was an American politician from Missouri. He was US Representative for 12 terms (1929-1931, 1935-1957). A member of the Republican Party, he was a staunch opponent of President Franklin D. Roosevelt's New Deal.

Early life
Short was born in Galena, Missouri, on April 7, 1898, to Jackson Grant Short and Permelia C. Long. Short attended Galena High School and Marionville College. He served in the infantry during World War I and graduated from Baker University in 1919 and from Boston University in 1922. Short also attended Harvard University, Heidelberg University, the University of Berlin, and Oxford University. He was a professor of ethics, psychology, and political philosophy at Southwestern College in Winfield, Kansas, in 1923, 1924, and 1926–1928. Short was a pastor of the Grace Methodist Episcopal Church, Springfield, Missouri, in 1927. He married Helen Gladys Hughes of Washington, DC, on April 20, 1937. The couple had no children.

Politics
Short was elected as a Republican to the Seventy-first Congress (March 4, 1929 – March 3, 1931) and was an unsuccessful candidate for reelection in 1930 to the Seventy-second Congress. He resumed his former professional pursuits and was a delegate to the Republican National Convention in 1932. Short was an unsuccessful candidate in 1932 for nomination to the United States Senate but was elected to the Seventy-fourth Congress and the ten succeeding Congresses (January 3, 1935 – January 3, 1957). At the 1940 Republican National Convention in Philadelphia, Pennsylvania, Short received 108 delegate votes for the party's vice presidential nomination and was the runner-up to the eventual nominee, Charles L. McNary, who received votes from 848 delegates.

He served as chairman of the Committee on Armed Services in the Eighty-third Congress. On April 30, 1955, he was presented with an Honorary Ozark Hillbilly Medallion by the Springfield, Missouri, Chamber of Commerce during a broadcast of ABC-TV's Ozark Jubilee. Short did not sign the 1956 Southern Manifesto.

Short was an unsuccessful candidate for reelection in 1956 to the Eighty-fifth Congress. He was defeated by Charles H. Brown, the vote being 90,986 for Brown to 89,926 for Short. In 1945, he had served as a congressional delegate to inspect concentration camps in Germany. Short served as Assistant Secretary of the Army from March 15, 1957, to January 20, 1961, and was later President Emeritus of the National Rivers and Harbors Congress. Short died in Washington, D.C., on November 19, 1979, and was interred in Galena Cemetery, Galena, Missouri.

Richard Nixon cited Short as perhaps the finest orator he had ever seen in his book, In the Arena.

Quotes

"I deeply and sincerely regret that this body has degenerated into a supine, subservient, soporific, superfluous, supercilious, pusillanimous body of nitwits, the greatest ever gathered beneath the dome of our National Capitol, who cowardly abdicate their powers and, in violation of their oaths to protect and defend the Constitution against all of the Nation's enemies, both foreign and domestic, turn over these constitutional prerogatives, not only granted but imposed upon them,to a group of tax-eating, conceited autocratic bureaucrats a bunch of theoretical, intellectual, professorial nincompoops out of Columbia University, at the other end of Pennsylvania Avenue who were never elected by the American people to any office and who are responsible to no constituency. These brain trusters and 'new dealers' are the ones who wrote this resolution, instead of the Members of this House whose duty it is, and whose sole duty it is, to draft legislation." 
--- Delivered in the U.S. House of Representatives on January 23, 1935.

"Mr. Jefferson founded the Democratic Party and President Roosevelt has dumfounded it.""I have always been old-fashioned enough to believe it is much better to 'git up and get' than it is to 'sit down and set.' The only animal I know which can sit and still produce dividends is the old hen.""I know that without change there would be no progress, but I am not going to mistake mere change for progress.""I look at the Supreme Court and know why Jesus wept."See also

Assistant Secretary of the Army

References

Wiley, Robert S., Dewey Short, Orator of the Ozarks''. Cassville, Miss.: Litho Printers and Bindery, 1985.

External links
 Retrieved on 2009-02-21

Alumni of the University of Oxford
United States Army personnel of World War I
Baker University alumni
Boston University alumni
Harvard University alumni
Heidelberg University alumni
1940 United States vice-presidential candidates
People from Stone County, Missouri
1898 births
1979 deaths
Republican Party members of the United States House of Representatives from Missouri
Old Right (United States)
20th-century American politicians
Military personnel from Missouri
People from Galena, Missouri
Southwestern College (Kansas) alumni